"Hell Is for Children" is a hard rock song by American rock singer Pat Benatar. It was written by guitarist Neil Giraldo, bass player Roger Capps and Benatar.  The song is about child abuse and was recorded by Benatar in 1980 for her second studio album Crimes of Passion.  While it was not released as an A-side single, it was a hit on album-rock radio stations as it reached number 7 on the Tunecaster Rock Tracks Chart.

Pat Benatar started writing the song after reading a series of articles on child abuse in The New York Times.  She was shocked to learn such things happen and wanted to write about it.

A live version of this song from her album Live from Earth (1983) was released as the B-side of her "Love Is a Battlefield" single three years later. The song was featured in the 1981 animated film American Pop, as well as on the soundtrack.

Cover versions
 In 1989, thrash metal band Viking covered the song on the B-side of their album Man of Straw.
 In 2000, heavy metal band Seven Witches covered the song for their album City of Lost Souls.
 In 2002, the American comic horror metal band Rosemary's Billygoat covered the song for their album Evilution.
 In 2009, the Finnish metal band Children of Bodom covered the song for their cover album Skeletons in the Closet.
 In 2013, the American rock band Halestorm covered the song for their EP Reanimate 2.0: The Covers EP.
 In 2021, the American gothic metal band Unto Others covered the song for their album Strength.

Appearances in other media
The song was featured in the 1981 film American Pop as well as its soundtrack.

It also was in the opening credits background of the 1985 made-for-television movie Children of the Night, about
the children's shelter founded in Los Angeles by Lois Lee in 1979.
 
The song was used in a montage in the "School Is Hell" story in the Simpsons episode "Treehouse of Horror XXV".

In 2017, the movie American Satan used a cover of this song, sung by The Relentless (a fictitious band introduced in the movie). While the movie and music video show Andy Biersack of Black Veil Brides singing, the cover is actually voiced by Remington Leith of Palaye Royale.

In 2019, the song was used over the closing credits of Episode 8 of the second season of the television series Mindhunter.

References

Pat Benatar songs
1981 singles
Songs about child abuse
1980 songs
Chrysalis Records singles
Song recordings produced by Keith Olsen
Songs written by Pat Benatar
Songs written by Neil Giraldo